The 1960 United States presidential election in Idaho took place on November 8, 1960, as part of the 1960 United States presidential election. State voters chose four representatives, or electors, to the Electoral College, who voted for president and vice president.

Idaho was won by incumbent Vice President Richard Nixon (R–California), running with United States Ambassador to the United Nations Henry Cabot Lodge, Jr., with 53.78 percent of the popular vote, against Senator John F. Kennedy (D–Massachusetts), running with Senator Lyndon B. Johnson, with 46.22 percent of the popular vote. , this is the last election in which Custer County and Camas County voted for a Democratic presidential candidate.

Nixon won Idaho by 22,744 votes, or 7.6%, which was significantly less than fellow Republican Dwight D. Eisenhower in 1956, who won the state by a margin of 22.4%, or 61,111 votes. This marked the first time since its admission to the union in 1890 that Idaho would back a losing Republican in a presidential election. This was also the first time since 1900 that the state failed to back the winning candidate in a presidential election. 4 years later, Democrat Lyndon B. Johnson would win the state by a margin of 1.83%, or 5,363 votes, which as of the 2020 presidential election, is the last time a Democratic presidential candidate has carried the state, or even broken 40% of the total vote. As of the 2020 presidential election, this is the last time a statewide-losing Democratic presidential candidate has come within single digits of winning the state.

Results

Results by county

See also
 United States presidential elections in Idaho

References

Idaho
1960
1960 Idaho elections